Eagle Lake is a city in Polk County, Florida, United States. The population was 2,255 at the 2010 census. It is part of the Lakeland–Winter Haven Metropolitan Statistical Area.

Geography and climate

Eagle Lake is located within the Central Florida Highlands area of the Atlantic coastal plain, with a terrain consisting of flatland interspersed with gently rolling hills.

Eagle Lake is located in the humid subtropical zone, as designated by (Köppen climate classification: Cfa).

Demographics

As of the census of 2000, there were 2,496 people, 879 households, and 637 families residing in the city. The population density was 1,800.5 inhabitants per square mile (693.3/km2). The racial makeup of the city was 82.09% White, 4.73% African American, 0.68% Native American, 0.24% Asian, 9.86% from other races, and 2.40% from two or more races. Hispanic or Latino of any race were 21.47% of the population.

There were 879 households, out of which 34.8% had children under the age of 18 living with them, 48.9% were married couples living together, 17.4% had a female householder with no husband present, and 27.5% were non-families. 20.3% of all households were made up of individuals, and 8.8% had someone living alone who was 65 years of age or older. The average household size was 2.81 and the average family size was 3.21.

In the city, the population was spread out, with 29.4% under the age of 18, 9.5% from 18 to 24, 28.3% from 25 to 44, 20.9% from 45 to 64, and 11.9% who were 65 years of age or older. The median age was 33 years. For every 100 females, there were 96.1 males. For every 100 females age 18 and over, there were 93.4 males.

The median income for a household in the city was $31,250, and the median income for a family was $35,078. Males had a median income of $27,500 versus $19,417 for females. The per capita income for the city was $13,249. About 14.6% of families and 17.9% of the population were below the poverty line, including 18.9% of those under age 18 and 12.9% of those age 65 or over.

In 2010 Eagle Lake had a population of 2,255.  The racial and ethnic makeup of the population was 72.2% non-Hispanic white, 7.2% black or African American, 0.4% Native American, 1.6% Asian Indian, 0.6% Asians with ancestral origin elsewhere in Asia, 0.4% non-Hispanic reporting some other race, 3.0% two or more races and 16.1% Hispanic or Latino.

History

Eagle Lake began c. 1880 as a settlement when John Bingham purchased 160 acres on a knoll between the areas now known as Eagle Lake, Crystal Lake, and Spirit Lake. He named the lake on which his original cabin was constructed Eagle Lake because of a nesting in a nearby pine tree. About the same time (1882), Louisa McLeod purchased 115 acres in the area to the east. As the land was sold, the city began to take shape and was laid out around 1887.

Earlier on, Eagle Lake was known for its local businesses. These included a brickyard, a turpentine mill, and two citrus packing houses that were both lost in the 1940s. During the mid 1950s and into the 1960s, the city was host to a wooden bathing house with dressing rooms, long wooden covered dock, dance hall, picnic facilities, and a diving platform at the Crystal Beach Pavilion on the SW side of Eagle Lake. During the 1980s, the city adopted the motto "Growing with people in mind". It continues to be the tenet of the city today.

Government and politics
The City of Eagle Lake has a commission-manager form of government.  The city commission consists of five commissioners, each elected for a two-year term. The mayor and vice-mayor are sitting commissioners whom are elected annually by the commissioners.
The city's executive powers rest with the city manager, as contracted by the city commission. The budget for the 2014 fiscal year is $2.1 million. Water and sewer services are provided by the City of Eagle Lake to residents within the incorporated city limits and nearby areas. Eagle Lake is encompassed by the Southwest Florida Water Management District which regulates and permits the use of water in the region. The city of Eagle Lake also operates the Eagle Lake Public library, which is part of the Polk County Library Cooperative.

Law enforcement
After signing a contract with the Polk County Sheriff's office in 2007, the City of Eagle Lake began contracting law enforcement services from the Polk County Sheriff's Office.

Fire services
Fire services for the city are contracted with the Polk County Board of County Commissioners. Eagle Lake is home to Polk County Fire Rescue Station 460 (Rescue 46).

Library
The Eagle Lake Public Library is a member of the Polk County Library Cooperative. The library is located at 75 North Seventh Street Eagle Lake, Florida 33839. It is a part of the city hall complex.

Transportation
The main highway going through town is U.S. 17. At the southern end of town, the highway divides into two three-three lane one way segments, with the northbound section on 5th Street and the southbound segment on 4th Street. On the north side of town, the two segments converge to become. a six-lane divided highway. US 17 leads northward to Winter Haven and southward to Bartow. Eagle Lake also intersects with County Road 540. This thoroughfare provides access to State Road 570 and U.S. 98 for travel to nearby Lakeland, FL, and major metropolitan cities Tampa and Orlando. 
Eagle Lake is also located close to Bartow Municipal Airport. This location provides a travel hub for private flights in and out of the Central Florida area.

Education

Public schools 
Public schools in Eagle Lake (and all of Polk County) are operated by Polk County Public Schools.
 Eagle Lake Elementary
 Pinewood Elementary
 Lake Region High School

Colleges and universities
 Polk State College has campuses located in Lakeland, Winter Haven, and Lake Wales.
 The new Florida Polytechnic University is located within about 15 minutes of the city.
 Florida Southern College and Southeastern University are located in Lakeland.
 Warner University is located in Lake Wales.
 Webber International University is located in Babson Park.

Recreation and leisure
The city has a baseball / softball complex that has three 200' fields and one 275' field.  Additionally, the City Hall complex hosts basketball, racketball and shuffleboard courts, as well as a skate park and playground for children.

There are also two boat ramps available for access to Lake McLeod and Eagle Lake. At the Eagle Lake ramp, there is also a municipal park that has a pavilion, playground, beach, and restroom facilities.

References

External links
 City of Eagle Lake Website Official City Web Site

Cities in Polk County, Florida
Cities in Florida